Choi Yoo-jung (born August 21, 1976) is a South Korean actress. She starred in television series such as A Saint and a Witch (2003), Sunlight Pours Down (2004) and Immortal Admiral Yi Sun-sin (2004).

Filmography

Television series

Film

References

External links

1976 births
Living people
South Korean television actresses
South Korean film actresses
Place of birth missing (living people)